P/ (Elenin) is a periodic comet with a preliminary orbital period estimated at 13 ± 0.16 years. It came to perihelion (closest approach to the Sun) around 20 January 2011 at 1.2 AU from the Sun. The orbit is preliminary as it has only been observed over an observation-arc of 22 days. The comet was discovered on 7 July 2011 when the comet was 2.38 AU from the Sun and 1.4 AU from the Earth. It came to opposition 178.6° from the Sun on 22 July 2011 in the constellation Sagittarius.

The preliminary orbit shows the next perihelion passage to be around January 2024. An observation arc of 30 days would allow a better refinement to the orbit of this comet.

P/2011 NO1 was the second comet discovered by Leonid Elenin. The first comet discovered by Elenin was comet C/2010 X1. Both comets were discovered with the aid of the automatic detection program CoLiTec.

On 29 January 2013 the Minor Planet Center awarded Leonid Elenin a 2012 Edgar Wilson Award for the discovery of comets by amateurs.

References

External links 
 Orbital simulation from JPL (Java) / Horizons Ephemeris
 Elements and Ephemeris for P/2011 NO1 – Minor Planet Center
 Survey anniversary gift – a new comet is discovered! (Leonid Elenin – SpaceObs – 19 July 2011)
 New comet P/2011 NO1 (Luca Buzzi – 19 July 2011)
 New Comet: P/2011 NO1 (Remanzacco Observatory – 19 July 2011)

20110707
20110120